Tough Cookies is a comedy television series that aired on CBS in 1986; six episodes were broadcast.

This series premiered on the same date (March 5, 1986), and was also cancelled on the same date (April 23, 1986), as another CBS comedy series, Fast Times.

Plot
Chicago police detective Cliff Brady (Robby Benson) is dating an older woman named Rita (Lainie Kazan), who is not sure she can handle their relationship.

Cast
Robby Benson as Det. Cliff Brady
Lainie Kazan as Rita 
Alan North as Father McCaskey 
Adam Arkin as Danny Polchek
Elizabeth Peña as Off. Connie Rivera
Matt Craven as Richie Messina
Art Metrano as Lt. Iverson
 Robert Firth as Alfred (original pilot)

Episodes

References

1980s American sitcoms
1986 American television series debuts
1986 American television series endings
CBS original programming
Television shows set in Chicago